Mario Amare Bilate (born 16 July 1991) is a Russian professional footballer who plays as a striker for ADO Den Haag.

Playing career

XerxesDZB
Bilate broke into the XerxesDZB first team in March 2010 and scored seven goals in the ten games he appeared in. His form was impressive enough to win him a move to Sparta Rotterdam, where he had played earlier as a youth.

Sparta Rotterdam
Bilate joined Sparta Rotterdam in January 2011 on a two and a half year deal. He made his competitive debut on 7 August 2011 in a 1-0 win over Fortuna Sittard. In the summer of 2012 Bilate then signed a contract extension to keep him at the club until 2015.

Dundee United
Bilate was released from his Sparta Rotterdam contract a year early and signed a two-year contract with Dundee United in July 2014. Bilate had originally been set to join Eerste Divisie champions Willem II but the move fell through at the last minute after the Sparta Rotterdam board decided they wanted a transfer fee. He made his debut as a substitute in Dundee United's opening match of the 2014–15 season, a 3–0 win against Aberdeen on 10 August 2014. He then scored the winning goal on his home debut three days later, in a 1–0 victory over Motherwell, again after coming off the bench. He was released from his contract at Tannadice in November 2015, after making only two appearances in the 2015–16 season.

Return to the Netherlands
Bilate signed a one-year contract with Den Bosch on 30 June 2016, with an option for another year.

On 7 June 2017, Bilate signed a one-year deal with an option for an extra season with Emmen. One year later, in June 2018, he signed a one-year contract with RKC Waalwijk with an option for one more season. He was promoted to the Eredivisie with RKC in the 2018–19 season.

On 11 September 2020, Bilate was involved in a swap deal between RKC and NAC Breda, with him leaving for the latter and Finn Stokkers moving to the former. His contract was not extended after the 2021–22 season, effectively making him a free agent. According to him, he had been injured for six months due to mismanagement within the club, and had to find out through media reports that his contract had not been extended.

On 30 August 2022, Bilate signed a one-year contract with ADO Den Haag.

Career statistics

Personal life
His father Amare is Ethiopian, he met Mario's Russian mother Marina in Moscow when Amare was enrolled in the Moscow Conservatory to become a conductor and Marina was a student of singing at Gnessin State Musical College. The family moved to the Netherlands when Mario was 1.5 years old.

References

External links
 
 

1991 births
Living people
Footballers from Moscow
Association football forwards
Russian footballers
Dutch footballers
Russian people of Ethiopian descent
Dutch people of Russian descent
Dutch people of Ethiopian descent
Russian emigrants to the Netherlands
XerxesDZB players
Sparta Rotterdam players
Dundee United F.C. players
FC Den Bosch players
FC Emmen players
RKC Waalwijk players
NAC Breda players
ADO Den Haag players
Eredivisie players
Eerste Divisie players
Scottish Professional Football League players
Russian expatriate footballers
Dutch expatriate footballers
Expatriate footballers in Scotland
Dutch expatriate sportspeople in Scotland